Goat Lake is a glacial lake located in Snohomish County, Washington and in the Mount Baker-Snoqualmie National Forest. The lake is a popular area for hiking, backpacking, and fishing.

Gallery

See also
Gothic Basin

References

External links
Elliott Creek (Goat Lake) Trail 647

Lakes of Washington (state)
Lakes of Snohomish County, Washington